In the 1956 Wimbledon Championships men's singles, Lew Hoad defeated Ken Rosewall in the final, 6–2, 4–6, 7–5, 6–4, to win the gentlemen's singles tennis title. It was the first of three years in which Australian players dominated the Wimbledon Men's Singles final. Tony Trabert was the defending champion, but was ineligible to compete after turning professional. The competition lasted from Monday 25 June to Saturday 7 July 1956.

Ulf Schmidt, from Sweden, was the only player from outside Australia and the United States to reach the quarterfinal stage.

It was the first Wimbledon tournament in which Australian Rod Laver competed in senior competition; 17-year-old Laver, a qualifier, was defeated in the first round by Orlando Sirola.

Seeds

  Lew Hoad (champion)
  Ken Rosewall (final)
  Sven Davidson (second round)
  Budge Patty (second round)
  Jaroslav Drobný (first round)
  Ham Richardson (semifinals)
  Kurt Nielsen (third round)
  Vic Seixas (semifinals)

Draw

Finals

Top half

Section 1

Section 2

Section 3

Section 4

Bottom half

Section 5

Section 6

Section 7

Section 8

References

External links

Men's Singles
Wimbledon Championship by year – Men's singles